Rho GTPase may refer to:
Any member of the Rho family of GTPases
The members of the Rho family of GTPases belonging to the Rho subclass
RHOA, the most-studied member of the Rho subclass of the Rho family of GTPases